Victoriano Salado Álvarez (30 September 1867 – 13 October 1931) was a Mexican writer, a prominent figure on the debate about Modernism in Mexican literature. He also served as secretary of Foreign Affairs in the cabinet of President Porfirio Díaz (1911) and as envoy extraordinary and minister plenipotentiary of Mexico to Guatemala and El Salvador (1911–1912).

He was born in Teocaltiche, Jalisco, on 30 September 1867 and died in Mexico City, on 13 October 1931.

Works
 (seven volumes, 1902-1906).
 (1899).
 (1901).
 (1924).

 (1933).
 (1937).

Notes and references

1867 births
1931 deaths
Presidents of the Chamber of Deputies (Mexico)
Mexican Secretaries of Foreign Affairs
Ambassadors of Mexico to El Salvador
Ambassadors of Mexico to Guatemala
Politicians from Jalisco
People from Teocaltiche